Angelique Widjaja was the defending champion, but she did not compete in the juniors this year.

Anna-Lena Grönefeld won the tournament, defeating Vera Dushevina in the final, 6–4, 6–4.

Seeds 

  Vera Douchevina (final)
  Anna-Lena Grönefeld (champion)
  Michaëlla Krajicek (semifinals)
  Tatiana Golovin (second round)
  Anaïs Laurendon (first round)
  Alisa Kleybanova (third round)
  Kateřina Böhmová (quarterfinals)
  Virág Németh (first round)
  Aurelija Misevičiūtė (first round)
  Viktoria Kutuzova (first round)
  Marta Domachowska (first round)
  Vojislava Lukić (third round)
  Ryōko Fuda (first round)
  Sania Mirza (first round)
  Nadja Pavic (first round)
  Julia Cohen (first round)

Draw

Finals

Top half

Section 1

Section 2

Bottom half

Section 3

Section 4

Sources 
 Draw

Girls' Singles
French Open, 2003 Girls' Singles